Cenad (during the Dark Ages Marosvár; , archaically Miereschburg;) is a commune in Timiș County, Romania. It is composed of a single village, Cenad. The village serves as a customs point on the border with Hungary. Today's village was formed by merging Cenadu Mare ("Great Cenad" or "Rascian Cenad") and Cenadu Vechi ("Old Cenad" or "German Cenad") in the 20th century.

Geography 
Cenad is located in the west of Timiș County, on the left bank of the Mureș River, on the border with Hungary. It borders Igriș to the northeast, Saravale to the southeast, Sânnicolau Mare to the south, Dudeștii Vechi to the southwest and Beba Veche to the west.

Climate 
The climate is temperate continental, with weak Mediterranean influences. It is manifested by milder winters and summers that are not excessively hot, the average annual temperature being 10.8 °C, and the average multiannual rainfall being 536.3 mm.

History 
Cenad is one of the localities with the oldest documented history in the entire Banat. The human presence is signaled on its territory since the Neolithic, about 7,000 years ago. Archaeological cultures such as Starčevo–Criș, Vinča, Tisza and Tiszapolgár, through discoveries in several places, demonstrate the consistency of human habitation at that time. From the Bronze Age there are archaeological discoveries of household objects and funerary urns. The Roman era is well represented by numerous discoveries, both pottery, tools, bricks from various constructions bearing the stamps of some Roman military units and coins issued by various Roman emperors. Later, other discoveries confirmed the Byzantine influence and the existence of a settlement from the 8th–9th centuries.

From Morisena to Cenad 
Cenad was known until the 13th century as Morisena. The legionary camp of the Legio XIII Gemina was located there. In the Middle Ages, the site was a temporary capital for Huns and then for Avars. It was subsequently ruled by the First Bulgarian Empire, prior to the Hungarian conquest. At the beginning of Stephen I's reign, the first King of Hungary, Ahtum had his residence here, who brought architects from Greece to build a church, a monastery and a palace. Being a pagan, his rulership was marked by several abuses against the local population, which is why Stephen I decided to send against him Chanadinus, a relative of the king and a former friend of Ahtum, Christianized at Esztergom. Chanadinus defeated and killed Ahtum, occupying his realm. As a reward, the king establishes a new county bearing Chanadinus' name and having its seat at Morisena, which also receives the status of royal fortress.

In 1030 the king established a diocese led by Gerard, bishop of Venice, who would become a saint of the Catholic Church. He built a church and established a monastery dedicated to the Mother of God. On this occasion he brought Italian engineers, who settled here and built on the site of the old fortress of Morisena the fortress of Cenad.

Medieval Cenad 

During the Middle Ages, Cenad was quite important in the Kingdom of Hungary. As proof are the visits that different kings made here over time: Ladislaus IV in 1278, Charles I in 1322, Louis I in 1366, Sigismund several times between 1394–1436 and Ladislaus V in 1459. John Hunyadi was at one time prefect of Csanád County.

Cenad was attacked and destroyed during the great Tatar invasion of 1241. It was later rebuilt by Bishop Bulcsú Lád. Cenad was the initial seat of the homonymous county, until 1526. It was part of the Eastern Hungarian Kingdom between 1526 and 1551, before the Ottoman conquest. It was the center of the Sanjak of Çanad between 1551 and 1595 and again between 1598 and 1707. From 1707 to 1716, it was a kaza center within the Sanjak of Temeşvar in the Eyalet of Temeşvar. Ottoman rule there was interrupted when the area was occupied by the Principality of Transylvania between 1595 and 1598, and ended with the Austrian conquest in 1716.

Cenad in the 18th–20th centuries 
After the defeat of the Turks by the Austrians, among the conditions of the Treaty of Karlowitz in 1699 was the demolition of the fortresses in Banat, as was the case of Cenad. The actual demolition took place under the coordination of General Oettingen. At that time, Cenad was inhabited mostly by Serbs. Under the Austrians, colonizations with Germans began, and the first wave settled here in 1764–1765. For this reason, a new locality is practically established, "German Cenad" (or "Old Cenad"), unlike "Great Cenad" (or "Rascian Cenad"), which was inhabited by Serbs. The two settlements later merged into a single entity.

In 1779, Csanád County was abolished and the commune became part of Torontál County. In 1858 it became the property of the Macedo-Romanian family Nakó, who also built a castle here. Cenad was occupied by Serbian troops in 1918 and finally passed to Romania after the Treaty of Trianon in 1920.

Demographics 

Cenad had a population of 4,207 inhabitants at the 2011 census, down 1% from the 2002 census. Most inhabitants are Romanians (63.39%), larger minorities being represented by Hungarians (12.36%), Roma (12.34%) and Serbs (6.39%). For 4.3% of the population, ethnicity is unknown. By religion, most inhabitants are Orthodox (61.47%), but there are also minorities of Roman Catholics (17.85%), Serbian Orthodox (6.44%), Greek Catholics (5.89%) and Pentecostals (2.59%). For 4.33% of the population, religious affiliation is unknown.

Tourist attractions 
 The ruins of the former fortress. It was built in the 13th century, destroyed during the great Tatar invasion of 1241 and rebuilt in the 16th century as a result of the Ottoman–Habsburg wars. The stone and earth fortifications were destroyed in the early 18th century to make way for the construction of the present-day village.
 The ruins of the former monastery dedicated to Saint John the Baptist. It was built by Greek architects hired by Ahtum in the late 10th century. A new monastery – Morisena Monastery – was founded here in 2003.
 St. Gerard Roman Catholic church, a neo-Gothic church built in 1870. It houses Gerard of Csanád's sarcophagus, honored as a saint and martyr in 1083.
 Cenad Forest (310.5 ha) and Great Island (3 ha), nature reserves included in the Lunca Mureșului Natural Park

References 

Communes in Timiș County
Localities in Romanian Banat
Hungary–Romania border crossings